Notebook is a 2006 Indian coming-of-age drama film directed by Rosshan Andrrews and written by Bobby-Sanjay. It is about three students at a boarding school and how they face up to challenges in their lives. The film stars Maria Roy, Roma Asrani, Parvathy Thiruvothu, Skanda Ashok and Suresh Gopi. The film dealt with the subject of teenage pregnancy.

The film was released on 15 December 2006. It received positive reviews and was also a commercial success at the box office. The film won the Kerala State Film Award for Second Best Film and Filmfare Award for Best Film – Malayalam.

Plot
The story begins with a New Year's Eve celebration at Lord's Academy in Ooty while three girls: Sarah Elizabeth, Pooja Krishna, and Sridevi plant a sapling to symbolize their friendship even after they graduate from the school. Three years later the trio is in 11th grade and the sapling they planted has grown into a tree Venus (named after the Goddess of Love).

The girls come from different family backgrounds — Sarah from a broken home, with separated parents yet maintaining a bold character; Sridevi, a Brahmin girl who is very much kind and sensitive in nature from a happy, close-knit family, with her parents doting on her, and Pooja, the ambitious one who is the school head girl, and is a single parented child staying with her mother in Ooty. Sridevi falls in love with a schoolmate, Sooraj Menon. Though hesitant at first, Sarah and Pooja approve their relationship after being convinced of Sooraj's sincerity.

During an excursion to Goa, Sreedevi and Sooraj make love, and eventually she becomes pregnant, much to the shock of Sarah and Pooja, and moreover herself. They keep the news to themselves, fearing the sorrow and wrath of Sridevi's parents; even Sooraj is kept in the dark, for fear that the news may leak out and he will simply leave the school. They decide to go for an abortion at a hospital near their school at Pooja's suggestion. During the Founder's Day celebrations at the school, the trio sneak out of the campus, and reach the hospital. Sarah convinces the gynecologist to conduct the abortion by telling several lies, including that Sridevi had been raped. During the procedure, Sridevi suffers excessive blood loss and dies. Sarah and Pooja flee the hospital in terror and return to school.

The next day they are summoned to the principal's office, where the police have arrived and the gynaecologist, brought as a part of the enquiry, identifies Sarah. Sarah confesses that the rape story was a lie and Sridevi actually had sex with somebody she loves, but she maintains she doesn't know who that is. Pooja, concerned about her future, distances herself from the whole episode, saying she knew nothing about it, leaving Sarah betrayed and angry. Concerned about the reputation of the school, the principal presses the cops for not registering a case, and dismisses Sarah from the school, announcing in assembly that Sridevi died in a car accident when she and Sarah sneaked out to watch a movie during school hours, and that Sarah is responsible for it. Sooraj learns the truth about Sridevi's demise, but her parents do not pursue the case. Pooja, now remorseful of her denial, tries to apologize to Sarah, but meets with hostility. Pooja loses her mental stability, unable to take the pressure of having lost both her best friends — one to death and the other to her own betrayal. Sarah's father Brigadier Alexander arrives and takes her to New Delhi for further studies, inspiring her to move on with life.

Six years later, at Sarah's graduation at medical college, a letter arrives, addressed from Sridevi, informing her that Pooja was in a mental asylum for 6 years, and she needs Sarah's company. It is also learnt that one of their classmates Firoz is now a famous music director. Sarah immediately returns to Ooty with Alexander to meet Pooja, who has been looked after for the last six years by her mother with Sooraj's help. They realize how much they missed each other and cycle to their school that very night to see Venus (the tree they had planted during their school days), as Sridevi's spirit is seen watching them.

Cast
Maria Roy as Sreedevi Swaminathan, a relatively silent girl. She is the truce maker whenever they disagree on something.
Roma Asrani as Sarah Elizabeth. Coming from a broken family. She is always ready to help anyone. (voice-over by Sreeja)
Parvathy Thiruvothu as Pooja Krishna, a smart student with a very practical mind.
Skanda Ashok as Sooraj Menon, Sreedevi's lover (voiceover by Vineeth Sreenivasan)
Suresh Gopi as Brigadier Alexander, Sarah's father 
Aishwarya as Elizabeth, Sarah's mother 
Seetha as Pooja's mother
Prem Prakash as Swaminathan, Sreedevi's father
Sukanya as Sridevi's mother
Raveendran as a doctor
Arathi as Swapna
Mejo Joseph as Feroz, a student
 Harith CNV as Student
 Aparna Nair as TV Journalist
 Vani Kishore

Production
The filming was primarily held at Lawrence School, Lovedale, Ooty. The director Roshan Andrews says "Although it cost a fortune to shoot there, it turned out to be perfect. I had visited many schools in Kerala, but couldn't find what I wanted." The other filming locations were the Medical College Ground and the Indian Institute of Management in Kozhikode. The casting of the film was done through open calls. According to the director, the cast was selected from 5000 applicants. The film was produced by Grihalakshmi Films, a production house known for family dramas. The budget of the film was 18 million.

Music
All the songs composed by debutant Mejo Joseph.Gopi Sunder  composed the background music for the film.
 "Hrudayavum" – Vineeth Sreenivasan, Jyotsna
 "Changathikoottam" – Rimi Tomy, Sayanora Philip, Afsal, Vidhu Prathap
 "Iniyum" – K. J. Yesudas, Manjari
 "As We All Know" – Donan, Ramya, Swapna, Vinaita

Release
The film was released on 15 December 2006.

Reception

Critical response
Reviewer from Sify, while complementing Andrews for taking up a taboo subject and casting newcomers, found the film unimpressive as a whole, and gave the verdict as "Ho-hum, just average". The Varnachitram.com review was generally positive, calling it an "interesting movie." However the reviewer felt that "[i]t takes the whole of the first half to reach the first plot point." He goes on to state that "[t]he line in the story would have read "Boy and Girl fall in love", but stretching it to the entire first half was, lets say a stretch." The reviewer lauded the direction and screenplay when the major theme of the film is dealt with. He also credited the director for "extracting great performances out of newcomers." The OneIndia.com review, though at first comments that "[t]here are times when you might feel as if the director is very obsessed with periods and pregnancy than the story itself", later adds that "the film's real theme seems to be something very relevant in today's changing times—the need for a strong family and support base."

Rediff.com review was generally negative. The reviewer felt that "[t]he single biggest handicap this film suffers from is the fact that none of the characters are real, believable." However, he adds that "[t]he bright spot is that the bunch of newcomers put in some exuberance into the otherwise turgid film." There was almost universal praise for the music of the film by debutant Mejo Joseph, who also plays a part in the film, and for the cinematography by C. Diwakar.
In an interviews the director Roshan Andrews revealed that "[s]even of Malayalam's best known directors—Priyadarshan, Sathyan Anthikad, Sibi Malayil, Joshy, Jayaraj, Lal Jose and I. V. Sasi—saw the film and personally called [him] up and said it was not only good but was touching."

Box office
The film was made on a budget of 3.75 crore. The film had a slow start at the box-office, but collections gradually picked up. It gained a distributor's share of 13.8 million from 35 screens in the first week. The film completed 150 days theatrical run.

Accolades
2006 Kerala State Film Awards
 Second Best Film – Rosshan Andrrews and P. V. Gangadharan
 Best Costume Designer – B. Sai

2006 Filmfare Awards South
 Best Film – P. V. Gangadharan
 Best Supporting Actress – Roma Asrani

2006 Asianet Film Awards
 Best New Face of the Year (Male) – Skanda Ashok
 Best New Face of the Year (Female) – Roma Asrani

References

External links
 

2006 films
2000s Malayalam-language films
2006 romantic drama films
Indian romantic musical films
Films scored by Gopi Sundar
Teenage pregnancy in film
Films shot in Ooty
Films with screenplays by Bobby-Sanjay
Films directed by Rosshan Andrrews